Qareh Gol is a village in Leylan-e Jonubi Rural District, Leylan District, Malekan County, East Azerbaijan Province, Iran. At the 2006 census, its population was 654, in 157 families.

References 

Populated places in Malekan County